The Eddleman–McFarland House, sometimes known as the Ball–Eddleman–McFarland House or just the McFarland House, is a historic residence built in 1899 in the Quality Hill section of Fort Worth, Texas.

History
The house on the bluff above the Trinity River was built in 1899 in the area then known as Quality Hill. This neighborhood contained many of the large Victorian homes of the "Cattle Baron Families", few of which are still standing. Howard Messer designed the house for Sarah Ball, who died within five years of the house's construction. William Eddleman, founder of the Western National Bank, then bought the house.  His daughter, Carrie McFarland, lived in the house until her death in 1978. Eddleman's bank was founded in 1906 and failed in 1913.

The Junior League of Fort Worth bought the house in 1979 and it was later acquired by Historic Fort Worth, Inc. It is open for tours and available for rentals.

Architecture
The exterior of the house is constructed of brick, sandstone, and marble in the Victorian and Queen Anne styles. In the interior are mainly mahogany and oak mantles, cornices, coffered ceilings, paneling and parquet floors.

See also

National Register of Historic Places listings in Tarrant County, Texas
Recorded Texas Historic Landmarks in Tarrant County

References

External links

Historic Fort Worth

Houses in Fort Worth, Texas
Houses on the National Register of Historic Places in Texas
Victorian architecture in Texas
Houses completed in 1899
National Register of Historic Places in Fort Worth, Texas
Recorded Texas Historic Landmarks
Museums in Fort Worth, Texas
Historic house museums in Texas